VRP may refer to:

 Vehicle routing problem, a problem in combinatorial optimization
 Virtual resource partitioning, an operating system-level virtualization technology
 Visual reporting (or reference) point in general aviation
  French administrative and professional status of salesmen
 VRP Music, a venture of American record producer, executive producer and an independent record label owner Rob Halprin
 People's Justice Party, also known as the Reich Party for Civil Rights and Deflation, a political party active in the Weimar Republic in Germany
 Vehicle Recycling Partnership, operated by the US Council for Automotive Research to support cash for cars vehicle recycling
 Pedrinho VRP, alias of Brazilian footballer Pedro Luís Vicençote doing business as a football agent
 Vulnerability rewards program, another name for a Bug bounty program